The Sula fruit dove (Ptilinopus mangoliensis) is a species of bird in the family Columbidae.  It is endemic to the Sula Islands.  Its natural habitat is subtropical or tropical moist lowland forests. It is threatened by habitat loss.

References
Rheindt, F.E., J.A. Eaton, and F. Verbelen 2011. Vocal trait evolution in a geographic leapfrog pattern: speciation in the Maroon-chinned Fruit Dove (Ptilinopus subgularis) complex from Wallacea. Wilson Journal of Ornithology 123: 429–440.

Ptilinopus
Birds of the Maluku Islands
Dove, Sula fruit
Dove, Sula fruit
Dove, Sula fruit
Birds described in 1898